Elements is a large shopping mall located 
at Union Square, on 1 Austin Road West, West Kowloon, Hong Kong. It is developed and managed by MTR Corporation through its subsidiary Premier Management Service.

Description and architectural themes

Elements is located directly above the Kowloon MTR station and near the International Commerce Centre, residential complex Union Square and the Western Harbour Crossing.

Zoning
The mall is divided into five zones based on the concept of the five elements of Nature, namely Metal, Wood, Water, Fire and Earth. Each zone is designed with a distinctive interior architectural theme that responds to the element, public art such as large scale sculptures are also employed to enhance the respective theme. The Metal Zone is symbolised by metal rings hanging from above, it is also where high fashion and jewellery brands can be found.

Facilities
The Elements has a total of 123 shops as of 2008, along with an ice rink and the 1600-seat Premiere Cinema (formerly The Grand Cinema), currently the largest cinema complex in Hong Kong.

The mall has ten washrooms, outside which there is a lobby with sitting area and magazine rack. Management said these are conceived for men "to wait for their girlfriends outside the washroom", providing "a decent and comfortable place for them to wait".

Male washrooms are stocked with colognes, aftershaves and electronic shavers while the female washrooms have perfumes and make-up. Staff are on hand to ensure that all these personal items are kept hygienic.

The shopping mall has a great emphasis on fashion and wardrobe with (as of 2008) 58 shops in that category out of a total of 123 shops in the mall.

Transport
Elements is immediately adjacent to the West Kowloon Terminus high-speed rail station, and directly connected to Kowloon station which is served by the Tung Chung line and Airport Express which features in-town check in service. The shopping mall is also connected to Austin station which is served by the West Rail line. There are also taxi stands for red taxis in the shopping mall along with two carparks one in the North and another in the South of the mall.

Gallery

See also
 Ice rinks in Hong Kong

References

External links

 Official website

Shopping centres in Hong Kong
Shopping malls established in 2007
Sun Hung Kai Properties
Union Square (Hong Kong)
West Kowloon